Fonseka is a Sri Lankan surname of Portuguese origin. Notable people with the surname include:

Anoma Fonseka (born 1957), Sri Lankan wife of Sarath Fonseka
Damayanthi Fonseka (born 1960), Sri Lankan Actress
Malini Fonseka (born 1947), Sri Lankan actress
Samanalee Fonseka (born 1981), Sri Lankan actress and singer
Sarath Fonseka (born 1950), Sri Lankan military leader and politician
Senali Fonseka (born 1992), Sri Lankan actress

Sinhalese surnames